The following lists events that happened during 1951 in Chile.

Incumbents
President of Chile: Gabriel González Videla

Events

January 
 16 January – The United States allocates $231,000 in Point Four funds for education projects in Chile.
 18 January – 6,000 Chilean bakery, railroad and racetrack workers begin strikes.

February 
 14 February – 7,000 workers in Antofagasta strike in a demand for higher wages.
 23 February –  The Confederation of Non-Government Employees labor union strikes in solidarity with the Antofagasta workers. The government responds by alerting the military and seizing the bus system.

March 
 2 March – The Chilean government places the province of Antofagasta under military control as a result of the strikes.
 18 March – Inez Enriquez Frodden is named as the first Chilean woman Deputy.

April 
26 April - The National Association of the Press is founded, the largest association of newspaper and magazine publishing companies in the country.

November 
13 November - In Chillán, the Cooperativa de Consumption de Energía Eléctrica de Chillán Ltda was created. Initially it was to regulate the supply of electricity, but today it is the largest company in the Ñuble Province.

Births
7 March – Juan Machuca, footballer
21 June – Miguel Ángel Gamboa, footballer
10 August – Mario Galindo, footballer
21 August – Eric Goles, mathematician and computer scientist
29 September – Michelle Bachelet, politician, President of Chile
7 November – Guillermo Encina, golfer
10 November – Enzo Escobar, footballer

Deaths
8 February – Ignacio Urrutia Manzano, politician, President of the Senate of Chile (b. 1879)

References 

 
Years of the 20th century in Chile
Chile